Piedmont Lithium is an Australian mining company in the process of proving economic mineral recovery of lithium in Gaston County, North Carolina.

History 
"The modern lithium-mining industry started in this North Carolina region in the 1950s, when the metal was used to make components for nuclear bombs. One of the world’s biggest lithium miners by production, Albemarle Corp, is based in nearby Charlotte. Nearly all of [Albemarle's lithium as of March 2021], however, is extracted in Australia and Chile, which have large, accessible deposits of the metal"." , just one percent of global lithium supply is both mined and processed in the United States, while  is produced in Australia and Chile.

Piedmont Lithium Ltd was founded as an Australian company in 2016.  Cofounders included Australian financier Taso Arima and US geologist Lamont Leatherman, who raised several million dollars of seed funding to start the firm.  Arima read about the prospecting work Leatherman had done in the Gaston County, North Carolina area. Leatherman had explored the area for lithium in surface rock in the late 2000s after thinking back to "the green-striped rocks in the yard of his childhood home in [the area]. The rocks contained rich veins of lithium."

In September 2020, Piedmont signed a sales agreement with Tesla to supply high-purity lithium ore for up to ten years, specifically to supply "spodumene concentrate ('SC6') from Piedmont's North Carolina deposit to Tesla."

As of early 2021, Piedmont is exploring by  drilling many sample cores across  of land it owns or has mineral rights to in Gaston County that surface prospecting had previously shown to contain substantial hard rock mineral deposits in the surface rock.

With substantial demand growth for lithium occurring in the 2020s, lithium mining and production companies are growing and some are experiencing marked increases in market valuation. The stock prices of Piedmont Lithium, as well as Lithium Americas and MP Materials, increased substantially in early 2021 as a result of the increased importance of lithium to the global economy.

In March 2021, Piedmont Lithium Ltd proposed a "re-domiciliation from Australia to the United States" under which a newly formed US corporation, Piedmont Lithium Inc, would acquire the Australian Company.  The arrangement could be finalized as soon as 2Q21 if approved by the shareholders of Piedmont Lithium Ltd. Shareholders approved the proposal on April 29, 2021, and if several additional legal and regulatory conditions are met, the company could become a US corporation as early as May 17, 2021.

References

External links 
Piedmont Lithium

Mining companies
Multinational companies
2016 establishments in Australia
Lithium mines in the United States
Mineral exploration
Geography of Gaston County, North Carolina
Mining in North Carolina
Proposed infrastructure in the United States
Environment of North Carolina